Detzer is a surname. Notable people with the surname include:

 Diane Detzer (1930–1992), American science fiction writer
 Dorothy Detzer (1893–1981), American feminist
 Sandra Detzer (born 1980), German politician

See also
 Desert

Surnames of German origin
German-language surnames